Afro Mobile is a Ugandan internet television live streaming platform currently based in Kampala, Uganda. The app is compatible with iOS and Android phones with a web app for direct access.

Overview
As of 2022, their OTT streaming television service had over 500,000 subscribers.
The Afro mobile application was launched in January 2021 at Next Media Park Kampala.
The application has over 30 televisions and over 50 radio stations.
Since August 2022, Afro Mobile application is a paid up service.

Location 

Its headquarter is at Next Media Park, Plot 13, summit view Road, Kampala, Uganda.

References

External links 

   
 https://baboonforestent.com/afro-mobile-app-aiding-ugandan-art-creatives-to-thrive/
 Afro Mobile App Uganda, All you Need to Know
 Afro Mobile news app launched - Nile Post
 https://thebrinknews.com/afro-mobile-tv-and-radio-streaming-app-launched/

Livestreaming software
Streaming software
Companies based in Kampala
Internet television streaming services
Companies established in 2021
Internet properties established in 2021
2021 establishments in Uganda